Georg Wilhelm Degode (6 February 1862 – 26 November 1931) was a German landscape painter and photographer; associated with the Düsseldorfer Malerschule.

Biography 

Degode was born in Oldenburg to a family of merchants, and was originally intended to follow in that profession. At the age of thirteen, he persuaded them to let him take drawing lessons from the curator at a local art gallery. After completing his secondary education, in 1881, he gained the support of his mother to attend the Kunstakademie Düsseldorf. His initial teachers were Heinrich Lauenstein and Hugo Crola. Later, he studied with   Carl Jungheim,  and Eugen Dücker, as well as taking private lessons. 

In 1884, he took his first study trip through Eifel, from Malmedy to the Moselle Valley. Between then and 1927, he would make twenty-one such trips to the area; many in the company of his colleagues. In 1885, he joined the progressive artists' association, Malkasten, and participated in their annual performances. He married Sophie Stüve, from Osnabrück, in 1886. They had two sons and two daughters; the youngest boy and girl were twins.

After 1893, he became a regular visitor to the artists' colony in Willingshausen. In 1898, he purchased a large home in Düsseldorf's Kaisersweth district, originally built as a clerical  house in 1704. From 1833 to 1852, it was used as the Town Hall. Under his ownership, it served as a gathering place for most of the prominent artists in the city's art community, as well as writers, including Herbert Eulenberg.

In addition to his painting, he was an accomplished amateur photographer and a member of the Düsseldorfer Photovereinigung. He left approximately 3,500 photographic glass plates. He also published a book, Ginstergold. Erzählungen und Bilder aus der Eifel und dem Rheinland um 1900 (Ginstergold: Stories and pictures from the Eifel and the Rhineland around 1900), in which his paintings and photographs were accompanied by local stories and data he had collected himself. It was republished in 2001.

Sources 
 "Degode, Wilhelm", In: Ulrich Thieme (Ed.): Allgemeines Lexikon der Bildenden Künstler von der Antike bis zur Gegenwart, Vol.8: Coutan–Delattre. E. A. Seemann, Leipzig 1912, pg.550 (Online)
 Hans Paffrath (Ed.): Lexikon der Düsseldorfer Malerschule 1819–1918. Vol.1: Abbema–Gurlitt, Kunstmuseum Düsseldorf and the Galerie Paffrath. Bruckmann, 1997, 
 Anke Degode: Der Kaiserswerther Maler Wilhelm Degode, Düsseldorf 2001,

External links 

 More works by Degode @ ArtNet
 

1862 births
1931 deaths
German painters
German landscape painters
Kunstakademie Düsseldorf alumni
People from Oldenburg (city)